Medicosma forsteri is a species of small tree in the family Rutaceae and is endemic to a restricted area of Queensland. It has elliptical leaves and cream-coloured flowers borne singly or in small groups in leaf axils.

Description

Taxonomy
Medicosma forsteri was first formally described in 1985 by Thomas Gordon Hartley in the Australian Journal of Botany from specimens collected in 2000 near Mount Mellum by Paul Irwin Forster. The specific epithet honours the collector of the type specimens.

Distribution and habitat

Conservation status
This species is classified as of "least concern" under the Queensland Government Nature Conservation Act 1992.

References

forsteri
Sapindales of Australia
Flora of Queensland
Plants described in 1985
Taxa named by Thomas Gordon Hartley